Martin Koudelka (born February 11, 1976) is a Czech professional ice hockey player. He played with HC Oceláři Třinec in the Czech Extraliga during the 2010–11 Czech Extraliga season.

References

External links

1976 births
Czech ice hockey forwards
HC Oceláři Třinec players
Living people
Sportspeople from Pardubice
HC Stadion Litoměřice players
BK Mladá Boleslav players
Stadion Hradec Králové players
HC Slovan Ústečtí Lvi players
HC Havířov players
Motor České Budějovice players
HC Dukla Jihlava players
HC Dynamo Pardubice players
Czech ice hockey coaches